GoGo Penguin are an English band from Manchester, England, featuring pianist Chris Illingworth, bassist Nick Blacka, and drummer Jon Scott.

On 6 December 2021, the band announced via Bandsintown and other social media platforms the departure of Rob Turner, citing creative differences. Turner's replacement was revealed as Scott.

Music style
The band's music features break-beats, minimalist piano melodies, powerful basslines, drums inspired from electronica and anthemic riffs. They compose and perform as a unit. Their music incorporates elements of electronica, trip-hop, jazz, rock and classical music.

Critics have described GoGo Penguin's music with references to Esbjörn Svensson Trio,  Aphex Twin, Squarepusher, Massive Attack, Brian Eno, modern classical composers Shostakovich and Debussy, or contemporary minimal music composers like Philip Glass.

Critical reception
The band received positive reviews as they released their debut album Fanfares in 2012 and their follow-up album v2.0 in 2014. In September 2014, v2.0 was shortlisted for the Barclaycard Mercury Prize Album of the Year.

In 2015, GoGo Penguin signed to Blue Note Records (France). Their album Man Made Object was released in 2016; the following album, A Humdrum Star, was released on 9 February 2018.  An eponymously named album was released on 5 June 2020.

Discography

References

External links

Man Made Object – an interview with GoGo Penguin by JazzEspresso
GoGo Penguin's artist page on AllMusic

English jazz ensembles
Musical groups established in 2012
Musical groups from Manchester
2012 establishments in England